The New York City Interscholastic Math League (NYCIML) is a non-profit organization that organizes mathematics competitions to all participating member schools from New York City and beyond. Its executive committee consists of college students who are NYCIML veterans.

The league has four different levels of contests for students of different ages, experience levels and mathematics backgrounds. Each team consists of five students. Students compete individually and against different teams at the same time

External links
New York City Interscholastic Math League

Mathematical societies
Organizations based in New York City
Mathematics competitions
Learned societies of the United States